Abhijan may refer to:
 Abhijan (1962 film), a Bengali film directed by Satyajit Ray
 Abhijan (1984 film), a Bangladeshi film directed by Abdur Razzak
 Abhijaan (2022 film), an Indian Bengali biographical film directed by Parambrata Chatterjee